In Hawaiian mythology, Kinilau is the son of Menehune, son of Luanu’u. Hawaiians claim descent from the youngest of the twelve sons of Kinilau-a-mano (Tregear 1891:513).

See also
 Tinirau - general Polynesian
 Tinilau - Samoa
 Tinirau and Kae - Māori

References
E.R. Tregear, Maori-Polynesian Comparative Dictionary (Lyon and Blair: Lambton Quay), 1891.

Hawaiian mythology